WFNM (89.1 FM) is a non-commercial college FM radio station licensed to serve Lancaster, Pennsylvania. The station is owned by Franklin & Marshall College and broadcasts a variety format.

The station Advisor is Josh Hankins. Dan T. Lewis advised form January 1998 to 2018, when he retired. Dan has hosted the "Bessie Smith Green Tea Show" Mondays 5-7 AM. The station's shows are hosted by students, faculty & professional staff DJs. The station broadcasts an eclectic mix, with DJs having talk shows, playing music, or a mix of both.

In 2018, WFNM was ranked #19 on The Princeton Review's Top 20 Best College Radio Stations.

History
The Federal Communications Commission granted WFNM's first license on August 1, 1973.

References

External links
 
 

FNM
FNM
Radio stations established in 1973